Mahidharapura Dynasty (Khmer: រាជត្រកូលមហិធរៈបុរៈ ; Thai: ราชวงศ์มหิธรปุระ ; Roman: House of Mahidharapura, Mahidra pura) Family of Mahidharpura, some sources call Mahitarapura dynasty or Khom royal family.

History 
The Mahidharapura dynasty of the Varman dynasty was established by Hiranyavarman and was known after the accession of Jayavarman VIin 1080. Its ancestor was Bhavavarman I of Chenla kingdom. King Jayavarman VI was a nobleman of the royal family ruling Phimai (now Phimai District Nakhon Ratchasima Province). The royal line of Mahidharapura was the beginning of the family of many Khmer kings who settled in the Mun River basin near Prasat Phanom Wan, Prasat Phimai, Pradsat Phanom Rung, and the area of Lavo. It is an ancient royal family since the Funan era, having influence and power base in the southeast region and the Phanom Dong Rak mountain range. There are eleven monarchs in Mahidharpura, the first of which was Jayavarman VI and the last was Jayavarman IX (Jayavarmadiparamesvara).

List of Mahidharapura monarchs 
1. Hiranyavarman
2. Dharanindravarman I
3. Jayavarman VI
4. Suryavarman II
5. Dharanindravarman II
6. Jayavarman VII
7. Yasovarman II
8. Indravarman II
9. Jayavarman VIII
10. Indravarman III
11. Indrajayavarman
12. Jayavarman IX

References 

Khmer monarchs